USS Conyngham (DDG-17), the third ship named for Captain Gustavus Conyngham USN (1744–1819), was a Charles F. Adams-class guided missile armed destroyer in the United States Navy.

Conyngham was laid down by the New York Shipbuilding Corporation at Camden in New Jersey on 1 May 1961, launched on 19 May 1962 by Mrs. Carl B. Albert, wife of Representative Albert of Oklahoma, House Majority Leader and commissioned on 13 June 1963.

History 

Conyngham was one of a few warships with shamrocks on her stacks (and others for example). During her 27 years of commissioned service, Conyngham lived up to her motto, Ready to Serve. Her presence exerted a powerful influence during times of crisis and helped maintain peace as a component of NATO seapower throughout the Cold War period. Conyngham made 15 Mediterranean deployments—three to the Persian Gulf, seven to Northern Europe, and 11 deployments to the Caribbean. She distinguished herself during crises in Cyprus (1964, 1974); provided air cover for planes evacuating Americans from an insurrection in Amman, Jordan (1970); took part in contingency operations during the Arab-Israeli Yom-Kippur War (1973); was the escort combatant during the evacuation of Americans from Beirut, Lebanon (1976); and conducted Black Sea Freedom of Navigation operations (1979).

During the 1980s, Conyngham continued to support United States foreign policy when she served off the coast of Libya (1982); was awarded the Navy Expeditionary Medal for providing naval gunfire support of Marines stationed in, and off the coast of, Beirut, Lebanon (1983) and monitored maritime traffic off the coast of Nicaragua (1983). She sailed with the  Battle Group in support of U. S. intervention forces in Grenada (1983). While deployed to the Caribbean in 1986, Conyngham was credited with four drug interdictions and was awarded the Coast Guard Meritorious Unit Commendation Medal.

Conyngham continued superior performance as she escorted U. S. Flagged merchant shipping through the Persian Gulf during the Iran-Iraq War in 1987 in Operation Earnest Will. During that deployment she sortied from Bahrain on short notice and provided assistance to  after she was hit by two anti-ship missiles launched by an Iraqi F-1 Mirage. Conyngham was awarded the Navy Unit Commendation for her efforts in assisting the crippled ship. In 1988, Conyngham continue the Gus Can Do tradition during her deployments to the Fjords of Norway and Northern Europe.

A 16-year-old girl from Cork, Ireland stowed away aboard Conyngham in July 1988 during the 10-day return voyage to Norfolk. Eight sailors were found guilty of assisting her with the highest sentence being 70 days in the brig for hiding an illegal alien and aiding entry to the United States. She was returned to Ireland at which point she reported she was held against her will, drugged and sexually abused while on board. No charges were filed with regard to claims of drugs and sexual abuse.

Conyngham completed her fifteenth Mediterranean deployment and received her fourth Battle Efficiency "E" in 1989 while part of the  battlegroup.

Mainspace fire 
Conyngham suffered a severe fire on 8 May 1990, while conducting pre-deployment operations off the Virginia coast. A major fuel oil fire erupted from the ship's Forward Fire Room into the ship's superstructure, isolating the crew forward and aft, requiring an all-hands effort to extinguish it. The ship had just completed a maintenance availability and a fuel oil strainer had not been assembled properly by a contractor and not inspected to verify assembly by ships company. The result was that the assembly failed catastrophically and started a fuel oil fire, caused an officer to die, 18 other sailors to be injured and the ship to be decommissioned shortly thereafter.  and  rendered assistance during the incident.

Decommissioning 
Conyngham was decommissioned on 20 October 1990, stricken from the Naval Vessel Register on 31 May 1991 and sold for scrap on 15 April 1994. Conyngham was "broken up" in the Cape Fear River near Wilmington, North Carolina in 1995.

References

External links
MaritimeQuest USS Conyngham DDG-17 pages

 

Cold War destroyers of the United States
1962 ships
Charles F. Adams-class destroyers
Ship fires
Maritime incidents in 1990
Maritime incidents in the United States
Ships built by New York Shipbuilding Corporation